The Pan Africanist Congress of Azania (known as the Pan Africanist Congress (PAC)) is a South African national liberation Pan-Africanist movement that is now a political party. It was founded by an Africanist group, led by Robert Sobukwe, that broke away from the African National Congress (ANC) in 1959, as the PAC objected to the ANC's "the land belongs to all who live in it both white and black" and also rejected a multiracialist worldview, instead advocating a South Africa based on African nationalism.

History

The PAC was formally launched on 6 April 1959 at Orlando Communal Hall in Soweto. A number of African National Congress (ANC) members broke away because they objected to the substitution of the 1949 Programme of Action with the Freedom Charter adopted in 1955, which used multiracialist language as opposed to Africanist affirmations. The PAC at the time considered South Africa to be an African state by right an "inalienable right of the indigenous African people" and refused to support equal rights of the oppressed and oppressor, exploiter and exploited, the land dispossessor and landless Africans "the dispossessed". Historic Mission of the PAC of The People of Azania is "The complete freedom, liberation and independence of Afrika." This entails political, social, economic and military independence. Robert Sobukwe was elected as the first president, and Potlako Leballo as the Secretary General.

On 21 March 1960, the PAC organised a campaign against pass laws. People gathered in the townships of Sharpeville and Langa where Sobukwe and other top leaders were arrested and later convicted for incitement. Sobukwe was sentenced to three years and Potlako Leballo to two years in prison. Sobukwe died in Kimberley, Cape Province, 1978 of lung cancer. Immediately after the Sharpeville massacre the National Party Government banned both the ANC and PAC on 8 April 1960. The PAC responded by founding its armed wing, the Azanian People's Liberation Army.

Ideology
The PAC followed the idea that the South African Government should be constituted by the African people owing their allegiance only to Africa, as stated by Sobukwe in the inaugural speech of the PAC:
"We aim, politically, at government of the Africans by the Africans, for the Africans, with everybody who owes his only loyalty to Africa and who is prepared to accept the democratic rule of an African majority being regarded as an African."
It is Pan Africanism with three principles of African nationalism, socialism, and continental unity. Its body of ideas drew largely from the teachings of Anton Lembede, George Padmore, Marcus Garvey, Martin Delany, Kwame Nkrumah, and W. E. B. Du Bois.

The PAC initially advocated for a form of "Africanist Socialist Democracy", based on African and Black Identity, with the aim of creating a South Africa (which they would rename Azania) for Black South Africans, to the exclusion of other nationalities or ethnicities. Unlike the African National Congress' view on socialism, the PAC was stated to have rejected the concept of class oppression, instead focusing exclusively on national liberation. Nevertheless, their initial manifesto lists the "black working class" as the "driving force in the struggle" against white capitalists and "reactionary" middle-class groups. These socialist elements were strongly toned down by the 1990s, instead adopting a more "conservative" stance that sought not to restrict market forces and a commitment not to implement socialism "for the sake of it". The Pan Africanist Youth Congress of Azania described the new program as the "work of an element which is on the CIA payroll". However, by April 1992, the PAC's party leadership in the Annual Congress no longer showed opposition to taking part in the multiracial negotiations to end the apartheid.

The PAC historically rejected Marxism, opposed communism (though it itself had borrowed from some Maoist tenents) and the inclusion of ethnic minorities within the liberation struggle, instead advocating black liberation exclusively within a Black nationalist concept.

Leadership struggles
The PAC has been beset by infighting and has had numerous changes of leadership since its transition to a political party. In 1996, Clarence Makwetu, who led the party in the 1994 elections, was removed on the basis of "bringing the party into disrepute".

In August 2013, the PAC elected Alton Mphethi as president, after previous leader Letlapa Mphahlele was expelled in May amidst allegations of attempting to cause division in the party, financial impropriety and poor quality leadership.

A faction of the PAC continued to regard Mphahlele as leader. The matter was resolved in the courts, with Mpheti eventually being confirmed as party leader for the 2014 election.

Mpheti has since been charged with murder for the death of a Swazi national, Mthunzi Mavundla, and sentenced for R3 million school transport fraud.

Luthando Mbinda was elected president at the 2014 congress in Botshabelo, while Letlapa Mphahlele was elected in July 2015 in Manguang. Mbinda claimed that Mphahlele's election was not valid, as he was not a valid member, while Mphahlele challenged his expulsion in court.

The Independent Electoral Commission suspended the party's statutory fund’s allocations until there was clarity about who led the party, and in October 2015 the high court confirmed that Mbinda was the recognised leader.

Conflict then arose between Mbinda and Chief Executive Officer Narius Moloto. Mbinda was subsequently charged by the PAC and later expelled for bringing the organisation into disrepute. Narius Moloto was elected party leader in December 2017.

Infighting continued after the 2019 elections, with leader Narius Moloto unilaterally dissolving the party's structures, a decision which was later set aside by the courts.

In August 2019, in Limpopo, one faction elected Moloto as leader, while a week later in Bloemfontein, another faction elected Mzwanele Nyhontso as leader. In October 2019, the Independent Electoral Commission recognised Nyhontso as the legitimate party leader.

In November 2020, speaker of the National Assembly Thandi Modise received notice that the PAC had expelled Nyhontso, and notified him that he had therefore lost his seat in parliament as the PAC's sole representative. The opposing faction got a court order in December 2020 to reinstate Nyhontso, pending a court order challenging his removal from the party.

In August 2021, the court confirmed that Moloto's election was invalid, confirming Nyhontso as president, and in September 2021 Nyhontso was again sworn in as the party's sole MP.

Election results

National elections

|-
! Election
! Total votes
! Share of vote
! Seats
! +/–
! Government
|-
! 1994
| 243,478
| 1.25%
| 
| –
| 
|-
! 1999
| 113,125
| 0.78%
| 
|  2
| 
|-
! 2004
| 113,512
| 0.73%
| 
|  ±0
| 
|-
! 2009
| 48,530
| 0.27%
| 
|  2
| 
|-
! 2014
| 37,784
| 0.21%
| 
|  ±0
| 
|-
! 2019
| 32,677
| 0.19%
| 
|  ±0
| 
|}

Provincial elections

! rowspan=2 | Election
! colspan=2 | Eastern Cape
! colspan=2 | Free State
! colspan=2 | Gauteng
! colspan=2 | Kwazulu-Natal
! colspan=2 | Limpopo
! colspan=2 | Mpumalanga
! colspan=2 | North-West
! colspan=2 | Northern Cape
! colspan=2 | Western Cape
|-
! % !! Seats
! % !! Seats
! % !! Seats
! % !! Seats
! % !! Seats
! % !! Seats
! % !! Seats
! % !! Seats
! % !! Seats
|-
! 1994
| 2.04% || 1/56
| 1.81% || 0/30
| 1.47% || 1/86
| 0.73% || 1/81
| 1.27% || 1/40
| 1.63% || 0/30
| 1.73% || 0/30
| 0.93% || 0/30
| 1.06% || 0/42
|-
! 1999
| 1.14% || 1/63
| 1.15% || 0/30
| 0.73% || 0/73
| 0.26% || 0/80
| 1.41% || 1/49
| 0.66% || 0/30
| 0.74% || 0/33
| 0.66% || 0/30
| 0.49% || 0/42
|-
! 2004
| 1.00% || 1/63
| 1.18% || 0/30
| 0.85% || 1/73
| 0.19% || 0/80
| 0.94% || 0/49
| 0.69% || 0/30
| 0.84% || 0/33
| 0.43% || 0/30
| 0.42% || 0/42
|-
! 2009
| 0.54% || 0/63
| 0.33% || 0/30
| 0.31% || 0/73
| 0.07% || 0/80
| 0.53% || 0/49
| 0.32% || 0/30
| 0.26% || 0/33
| 0.22% || 0/30
| 0.23% || 0/42
|-
! 2014
| 0.44% || 0/63
| 0.21% || 0/30
| 0.26% || 0/73
| 0.08% || 0/80
| 0.29% || 0/49
| 0.23% || 0/30
| 0.14% || 0/33
| 0.11% || 0/30
| 0.17% || 0/42
|-
! 2019
| 0.41% || 0/63
| 0.17% || 0/30
| 0.24% || 0/73
| 0.07% || 0/80
| 0.17% || 0/49
| 0.14% || 0/30
| 0.11% || 0/33
| 0.11% || 0/30
| 0.19% || 0/42
|}

Municipal elections

|-
! Election
! Votes
! %
|-
! 1995–96
| 104,455
| 1.2%
|-
! 2000
|
| 1.2%
|-
! 2006
| 306,747
| 1.2%
|-
! 2011
| 118,822
| 0.4%
|-
! 2016
| 74,607
| 0.19%
|-
|}

See also

 Azanian National Youth Unity
 Azanian People's Liberation Army
 Freedom Charter
 History of South Africa

References

External links
Website of the Pan Africanist Congress
Alternative Website of the Pan Africanist Congress
Pan Africanist Congress Publications Collection 1958-1995
Archival Information can be found at the Borthwick Institute for Archives, University of York: Congress of South Africa

 
African and Black nationalist organizations in Africa
Political parties in South Africa
Political parties based in Johannesburg